Worimi (also spelt Warrimay), or Gadjang (also spelt Kattang, Kutthung, Gadhang, Gadang, Gathang) is an Australian Aboriginal language. It is the traditional language of the Worimi people, whose descendants now speak English. Work has started on revitalising the language with a dictionary and TAFE course in Gathang.

Classification

Worimi is most closely related to Awabakal, in the Yuin–Kuric group of Pama–Nyungan.

Bowern (2011) considers Gadjang, Worimi, and Birrpayi to be separate languages.

Phonology

Vowels

There is also the diphthong "ay", pronounced [aj].

Consonants

Within the orthography, both voiceless and voiced stops are written, words begin with voiced stops only and only voiced stops may occur in consonant clusters or suffixes. There is some inconsistency in the orthography to choice of stop intervocalically, the dictionary/grammar written by Amanda Lissarrague prescribes voiceless stops intervocalically, but this is violated many times such as in magu - axe. The phonemes /p/ and /b/ may contrast, such as gaparr - baby, boy, and gabarr - head. This is unclear.

There is some evidence of a merger of the dental and palatal stops/nasals, with free variation existing in many words, such as djinggarr~dhinggarr - silver, grey. 

At the end of a word, a nasal may also be pronounced as its corresponding stop. (E.g. bakan~bakat - rock). 

Intervocalically, "b" may be pronounced as [v].

References

External links
Bibliography of Worimi people and language resources, at the Australian Institute of Aboriginal and Torres Strait Islander Studies
Aboriginal Language the Kutthung

Worimi languages
Indigenous Australian languages in New South Wales